Cullen is a small village and civil parish in County Cork, Ireland, situated north west of Millstreet town, in the barony of Duhallow. It is about four miles east of the Kerry border and Rathmore village. St. Laitiaran's Well can be found in the area. Cullen is within the Dáil constituency of Cork North-West. 

The local Gaelic Athletic Association club, Cullen GAA, fields Gaelic football teams in the Duhallow divisional competitions. The former Minister for Education, Batt O'Keeffe, and poet and academic Bernard O'Donoghue are from the area.

See also
 List of towns and villages in Ireland

References

External links
 History From A Topographical Dictionary of Ireland, 1837

Towns and villages in County Cork
Civil parishes of County Cork